The Acropolis International Tournament 2013 was a basketball tournament held in OAKA Indoor Hall in Athens, Greece, from August 27 until August 29, 2013. It was the 26th edition of the Acropolis International Basketball Tournament. The four participating teams were Greece, Italy, Lithuania, and Bosnia and Herzegovina.

Venues

Participating teams

Standings 

|-bgcolor="gold"

|}

Results 
All times are local Central European Summer Time (UTC+2).

Final standing

Statistics 

Points

Rebounds

Assists

References

External links
Acropolis Cup 2013 Results

Acropolis International Basketball Tournament
Acropolis
2013–14 in Greek basketball
2013–14 in Italian basketball
2013–14 in Lithuanian basketball
2013–14 in Bosnia and Herzegovina basketball